In mathematical physics, the Wigner surmise is a statement about the probability distribution of the spaces between points in the spectra of nuclei of heavy atoms, which have many degrees of freedom, or quantum systems with few degrees of freedom but chaotic classical dynamics. It was proposed by Eugene Wigner in probability theory. The surmise was a result of Wigner's introduction of random matrices in the field of nuclear physics. The surmise consists of two postulates:
In a simple sequence (spin and parity are same), the probability density function for a spacing is given by,
 
 Here,  where S is a particular spacing and D is the mean distance between neighboring intervals.
In a mixed sequence (spin and parity are different), the probability density function can be obtained by randomly superimposing simple sequences.

The above result is exact for  real symmetric matrices , with elements that are independent standard gaussian random variables, with joint distribution proportional to  

In practice, it is a good approximation for the actual distribution for real symmetric matrices of any dimension.

See also 
 Wigner semicircle distribution

References

 
Mathematical physics
Nuclear physics